The list of ambassadors from Japan to Angola started when the first Japanese diplomat presented his credentials to the Angolan government in 1976.

Diplomatic relations were established in 1976.

List

 Tsunneshige Liyam  
 Susumu Shibata　
 Kazuhiko Koshikawa
 Ryōzō Myōi

References

Angola
Japan